The 2015–16 FC Terek Grozny season was the seventh successive season that the club played in the Russian Premier League, the highest tier of association football in Russia, and 7th in total. Terek Grozny also took part in the Russian Cup.

Squad

Out on loan

Transfers

Summer

In:

Out:

In

 Wilkshire's move was announced on the above date, becoming official on 1 January 2016 when the transfer window opened.

Out

Loans out

Released

Trial

Friendlies

Competitions

Russian Premier League

Results by round

Matches

League table

Russian Cup

Squad statistics

Appearances and goals

|-
|colspan="14"|Players away from the club on loan:
|-
|colspan="14"|Players who appeared for Terek Grozny no longer at the club:

|}

Goal Scorers

Disciplinary Record

References

External links
Official website 

FC Akhmat Grozny seasons
Terek Grozny